Rhydderch ap Iestyn (died 1033) was king of Gwent and Morgannwg in south Wales and later took over the kingdom of Deheubarth and controlled Powys.

Comparatively little has been recorded about Rhydderch ab Iestyn in the annals. He appears to have originally been ruler of Gwent and Morgannwg, where his son later continued to have his power base. When Llywelyn ap Seisyll, king of Gwynedd and Deheubarth died unexpectedly in 1023, Rhydderch was able to seize Deheubarth, apparently by force of arms. In 1033 Rhydderch is recorded by Brut y Tywysogion as having been slain by the Irish, but with no explanation of the circumstances.

The kingdom of Deheubarth returned to the original dynasty in the form of Hywel ab Edwin and his brother Maredudd. A battle between Hywel and his brother and the sons of Rhydderch is recorded the following year. In 1045 Rhydderch's son, Gruffydd ap Rhydderch was able to seize Deheubarth from Gruffydd ap Llywelyn and held it for ten years until Gruffydd regained it.

Rhydderch had at least three sons, they were as follows:
Gruffydd ap Rhydderch (died 1055), King of Morgannwg and Deheubarth, killed in battle against Gruffydd ap Llywelyn.
Caradog ap Rhydderch (died 1035), killed by the "Saxons".
Rhys ap Rhydderch (died 5 January 1053), put to death by order of King Edward the Confessor.

Sources
John Edward Lloyd A history of Wales from the earliest times to the Edwardian conquest (Longmans, Green & Co.)
 Thomas Jones, ed. Brut y Tywysogion: Peniarth MS. 20 version (Cardiff: University of Wales Press, 1952)

1033 deaths
Monarchs of Deheubarth
Monarchs of Gwent
Monarchs of Morgannwg
11th-century Welsh monarchs
Year of birth unknown
Monarchs of Glywysing